Nabab is an Indo-Bangladesh 2017 film directed by Joydip Mukherjee and produced by Abdul Aziz and Himanshu Dhanuka under the banner of Jaaz Multimedia and Eskay Movies. The film features Bangladeshi star Shakib Khan as an intelligence agent from Bangladesh tasked with a secret operation in West Bengal, India and Subhashree Ganguly as a crime news reporter, Nabab's love interest. And features Sabyasachi Chakrabarty, Amit Hasan, Aparajita Adhya, Kharaj Mukherjee and Arindam Saha in supporting roles. The soundtrack album and background score of the film was composed by Savvy Gupta and Akassh. The film was released on 26 June 2017 on the occasion of Eid in Bangladesh and released in India on 28 July 2017.

The film marks the second collaboration of Shakib Khan with Joydip Mukherjee after success of Shikari (2016).

Plot
A group of people travelling in a bus, later the bus stops for a tea break and the hooligans arrive at the same time when suddenly a passing convoy is attacked and the assassins try to kill the man inside one of the cars. The man using his swiftness foils the attack and manages to nab and arrest one of the attackers while killing another. The rest manage to escape the scene.

This man is Chief Investigating Officer Rajib Chowdhury (Shakib Khan) and the person in the car turns out to be Chief Minister Ananya Chatterjee (Aparajita Adhya) who was impressed with Rajib and delegates to him the task of locating the people behind a recent terrorist conspiracy to Rajib. Rajib promises to fulfill the job to the best of his ability.

Masud (Sagnik Chatterjee) a Muslim ACP is taken off from the Special Action Team when a notorious gangster Mustaq escapes his clutches. Despite being an honest and upright police officer with the best intelligence gathering network in the force, Masud is rueful that he is being given low class treatment because he is a Muslim and is being perceived as having let Mustaq escape because he was a Muslim as well. Rajib wants Masud on the team, but Masud refuses. It is revealed that Rajib's father Constable Shymal Chowdhury was killed by a terrorist in Bangladesh which motivated Rajib to join the police force.

Rajib escaped prison then went to the Commissioner's house to tell him the truth, but there he accused for the murder of the Commissioner. With the help of his love interest, Rajib reached to Mandal. But imprisoning his mother and a few colleagues Mandal trapped Rajib to kill CM in a high security zone.

Cast
 Shakib Khan as Rajib Chowdhury a.k.a. Nabab, an intelligence agent from Bangladesh tasked with a secret operation in West Bengal, India
 Subhashree Ganguly as Diya a.k.a. Salma, a crime news reporter
 Rajatava Dutta as Gautam Halder, a commissioner of West Bengal police
 Amit Hasan as Kali Charan Hazra
 Biswanath Basu as Bimal Debnath, a superintendent of West Bengal police
 Sagnik Chatterjee as ACP Masood Akhtar, an assistant commissioner of West Bengal police
 Sabyasachi Chakraborty as the chief journalist of a news agency
 Kharaj Mukherjee as Abhay Sarker, a Deputy Chief Minister
 Aparajita Auddy as Ananya Chatterjee, a Chief Minister of West Bengal, India
 Arindam Ganguly 
 Meghla Mukta as Meghla, daughter of commissioner Gautam Halder
 Rebeka Rouf as Nabab's mother
 Raju Sarkar
 Kamal Patekar as Terrorist
 Arindam Saha as Terrorist
 Pradip Dhar as Subir Mondal
 Prasun Gain as Dinu
 Badhon as Nabab's friend

Production

Filming
Before filming started Khan underwent extensive training for the action sequences and has reportedly lost 20 kg weight to fit as a counter-terrorism agent. The shooting schedule of Nabab commenced on 17 November 2016. The first phase of the film was shot in 10-day schedule and entirely filmed in Cox's Bazar. The second phase of the filming took place in Kolkata. The last phase of the film was filmed in Dhaka and Kolkata, and lasted 30-days. The entire film was shot on a 50-day schedule.

The music of the film was shot at various locations in Kolkata. A romantic track sequence was shot at Kolkata film city in East Bengal.

Release
Nabab released across 128 screens in Bangladesh on 26 June 2017 which is the widest release for any Bangladeshi film. Despite the release of two other films, Nabab opened on every multiplexes in Bangladesh.

Critical reception 
In a review by The Daily Star, Nabab was praised for its costumes and design, but was criticised for its acting and the story's similarities to the 1999 Hindi film Baadshah.

Soundtrack

The soundtrack for the film is composed by Savvy and Akassh.  The music video of the song "Sholoana" was released on YouTube on 1 June 2017. The music video of the song "Jabo Niye" was released on 10 June 2017. The music video of the song "O DJ O DJ" was released on 18 June 2017. The music video of the song "Saiyyan Beimaan" was released on 13 July 2017.

The full soundtrack was released for digital streaming on Saavn on 1 June 2017.

Track listing

Controversy 
After the release of trailers and songs from the film, different artists, producers, directors and 14 different film-related organizations in Bangladesh began to protest the release of Nabab. After claims by the protesters that the films 'broke' some of the rules of making joint ventures, the Censor Board of Bangladesh did not give clearance to release the films. In response, Jaaz Multimedia threatened to close down their cinema halls for Eid if their films would not be allowed to release. The protesters also brought Shakib Khan, star of Nabab, who once went on the streets of Bangladesh to protest the release of Indian films. Khan, at a press conference by Jaaz Multimedia, defended his position and former protests with claims that he only protested against big-budget Hindi/Urdu, not Bengali joint venture films. After a few weeks of protests, the Censor Board gave clearance to the films to release, in time to release on the holiday of Eid.

References

External links 

 
 
 

Indian romantic comedy-drama films
Bengali-language Indian films
Bengali-language Bangladeshi films
2017 films
Bangladeshi action comedy-drama films
2010s action comedy-drama films
2010s Bengali-language films
Films shot in Dhaka
Films set in London
2017 romantic comedy-drama films
Bangladeshi romantic comedy-drama films
Indian action comedy-drama films
Indian films about revenge
Bangladeshi films about revenge
Films scored by Savvy Gupta
Films scored by Akassh
Films about terrorism in India
2017 comedy films
2017 drama films
Films directed by Joydip Mukherjee
Jaaz Multimedia films